Windy Pass, elevation , is a mountain pass in the San Juan Mountains of Colorado.  The pass is in the San Juan National Forest southwest of Wolf Creek Pass.

See also
Colorado mountain passes

References

Mountain passes of Colorado
Landforms of Mineral County, Colorado
San Juan Mountains (Colorado)